The Horace video game series was created in the 1980s by William Tang for Beam Software. The series comprised Hungry Horace, Horace Goes Skiing and Horace and the Spiders.

Hungry Horace and Horace and the Spiders were two of the few ZX Spectrum games also available in ROM format for use with the Interface 2.

Hungry Horace

The original Horace game, Hungry Horace was written as a simple Pac-Man clone, published in 1982. In it, Horace must gather food from around a park and move onto the next section while avoiding park guards. It is possible for him to collect a bell to panic the guards and render them vulnerable, like the power pills in Pac-Man. This title was available on the ZX Spectrum, Commodore 64 and Dragon 32. The ZX Spectrum original was marketed and distributed by Sinclair themselves, the Commodore 64 and Dragon 32 versions by Melbourne House.

Horace Goes Skiing

In 1983 Tang produced Horace Goes Skiing, in which Horace must cross a dangerous road teeming with traffic, à la Frogger, to rent out a pair of skis, then get back over the road and successfully navigate a ski course.

This title is not a true sequel, as it does not follow on from an original story and is only similar in that it features the same character. Like Hungry Horace, this title was available on the ZX Spectrum, Commodore 64, and Dragon 32. As before, Sinclair distributed the Spectrum version, Melbourne House the Commodore 64 and Dragon 32 versions. In 2017, the game placed on Eurogamer'''s "10 games that defined the ZX Spectrum" list.Horace Goes Skiing was released on Steam by Pixel Games UK in October 2020.

Horace and the Spiders

In 1983, Tang produced the third title in the series, Horace and the Spiders. This was primarily a platform game with the Horace sprite retained from the first two games. The first level sees Horace climbing a hill while jumping over spiders. The second level involves crossing a bridge by swinging on spider threads. The third level is the final confrontation with the spiders – he must create holes in the web, luring the spiders into the holes to fix them and subsequently jumping on them.

Unlike the earlier two titles, this game was only released for the ZX Spectrum. The first stage of this game shared similarities with both Pitfall and the Colecovision game Smurf: Rescue in Gargamel's Castle, whilst the third platform stage is essentially a Space Panic clone.

Horace to the Rescue
This title was announced in 1985 but the game never appeared, due to the author Tang suffering a collapsed lung and being unable to continue.

Horace in the Mystic Woods
Horace made a comeback in 1995 with the platform based game Horace in the Mystic Woods for the Psion 3-Series of palmtop computers. This fourth entry in the Horace series is a platform game split into one-screen levels in the style of Manic Miner and was coded by Michael Ware of Proteus Developments. It is Series 3a/3c and 3mx compatible.

In 2010, a conversion of the game to the ZX Spectrum was released by indie coder Bob Smith.

Other appearances
In the Spectrum version of the 1987 game Inspector Gadget and the Circus of Fear, Gadget has to make his way through several scrolling worlds. In the first of these, he is hindered by Horaces travelling in the opposite direction; if he trips over too many of them, he loses a life.

A reference to Horace is also present in the 2003 PlayStation 2 game Dog's Life, which features a shop named Horace's Ski Shop. The name is written in a font similar to the one used on the ZX Spectrum, and is accompanied by a Spectrum-style rainbow pattern.

A fan made game Horace Goes to the Tower'' was released in 2011.

References

External links
  
 
 
 

1982 video games
1983 video games
ZX Spectrum games
Commodore 64 games
Dragon 32 games
Video game clones
Video game franchises introduced in 1982
Video games about food and drink
Video games developed in Australia
Video game franchises